Choi Kyung-Bok (born 13 March 1988) is a South Korean football player who since 2007 has played for Chunnam Dragons.

References

External links
 

1988 births
Living people
Jeonnam Dragons players
South Korean footballers
Association football midfielders